Lawrence Samuel Krasner (born March 30, 1961) is an American lawyer who is the 26th District Attorney of Philadelphia. Elected to the position in 2017, Krasner was one of the first in the United States to run as a self-described "progressive prosecutor". He campaigned on a platform to reform elements of the criminal justice system, including reduced incarceration.

During his tenure as DA, Krasner has sought to spearhead criminal justice reform. His policies include ending criminal charges against those caught with marijuana possession, ending cash bail for those accused of some misdemeanors and nonviolent felonies, reducing supervision for parolees, and seeking more lenient sentences for certain crimes. During his time in office, he has advocated for greater police accountability and pursued police misconduct. Penguin Random House published Krasner's memoir, For the People: A Story of Justice and Power, in 2021.

In 2022, Krasner was impeached by the Pennsylvania House of Representatives on multiple counts; several were for various alleged "dereliction[s] of duty" and "misbehavior[s] in office", and another was for attempting to obstruct the legislative probe that sought to impeach him. An impeachment trial was scheduled to take place in the Pennsylvania Senate, but was indefinitely postponed after the Commonwealth Court of Pennsylvania ruled none Krasner alleged derelictions or misbehaviors were impeachable offenses.

Early life and education
Krasner was born in St. Louis in 1961. His father, William Krasner, was the son of Russian Jewish immigrants, an author of crime fiction, and his mother, Juanita Frazier, was an evangelical Christian minister. His family moved to the Philadelphia area while he was still attending public school. He graduated from Conestoga High School in 1979.

Krasner graduated from the University of Chicago in 1983. He graduated from Stanford Law School in 1987.

Career
After graduation and passing the bar, Krasner returned to Philadelphia to work for the Federal Public Defender's Office. He opened his own law firm in 1993 and worked as a criminal defense lawyer in Philadelphia for 30 years, specializing in civil rights, and frequently representing protestors pro bono.

Krasner's representation of Black Lives Matter and Occupy Philadelphia members led many to call him an "anti-establishment" candidate during his 2017 primary campaign for the Democratic nomination. He campaigned against existing policies that had resulted in disproportionately high numbers of minority males being jailed and proposed other reforms in criminal justice. Krasner was a featured speaker at the 2017 People's Summit.

Philadelphia District Attorney

Election 
Philadelphia district attorney R. Seth Williams announced in February 2017 that he would not run for reelection. Williams resigned from office and pleaded guilty to federal bribery charges in June 2017; his interim replacement, Kathleen Martin, chose not to run.

Shortly before Krasner announced his candidacy, John McNesby, president of Lodge 5 of the Philadelphia Fraternal Order of Police, derided Krasner's intention to enter the race as "hilarious." McNesby opposed Krasner's promise to refuse to prosecute defendants whose detainments were illegally performed so arresting officers could earn overtime pay as well as his history of suing police officers who perpetrated corruption and brutality. Less than three weeks before the primary, a political action committee supporting Krasner's campaign received a $1.45 million contribution from billionaire George Soros.

Krasner won the May 16, 2017 Democratic primary with 38% of the vote, defeating former city and federal prosecutor Joe Khan, former Philadelphia Managing Director Rich Negrin, former First Assistant District Attorney Tariq El-Shabazz, former prosecutor Michael Untermeyer, former prosecutor Jack O'Neill, and former Municipal Court Judge Teresa Carr Deni. City officials reported voter turnout spiked nearly 50 percent compared to 2009, which was the last contested race for district attorney of Philadelphia. The primary was widely seen as a proxy election; the winner of the Democratic primary election is the presumptive victor of the general election since Philadelphia has almost seven times as many registered Democrats as registered Republicans. As expected, the November general election was not competitive, with Krasner winning almost three times as many votes as his Republican opponent, former assistant district attorney Beth Grossman.

Tenure
In his first week in office, Krasner fired 31 prosecutors from the District Attorney's Office, including both junior and career supervisory staff. Those fired represented nearly a 10% reduction in the number of Philadelphia assistant district attorneys.

In February 2018, Krasner announced that law enforcement would no longer pursue criminal charges against those caught with marijuana possession. That same month, Krasner instructed prosecutors to stop seeking cash bail for those accused of some misdemeanors and nonviolent felonies. Krasner said that it was unfair to keep people in detention simply because they could not afford bail.

Krasner also announced that the DA's office had filed a lawsuit against a number of pharmaceutical companies for their role in the city's opioid epidemic. Krasner instructed prosecutors to stop charging sex workers who had fewer than three convictions.

In March 2018, it was reported that Krasner's staffers were working on creating a sentence review unit to review past cases and sentences and to seek resentencing in cases when individuals were given unduly harsh punishments. That same month, Krasner instructed prosecutors to reduce sentence lengths to defendants making pleas, refuse to bring certain low-level charges, and publicly explain their reasoning for pursuing expensive incarcerations to taxpayers footing the bills. He said, 
"Fiscal responsibility is a justice issue, and it is an urgent justice issue. A dollar spent on incarceration should be worth it. Otherwise, that dollar may be better spent on addiction treatment, on public education, on policing and on other types of activity that make us all safer."

In 2018, some judges rejected the reduced sentences which Krasner's prosecutors had sought for juveniles who had previously been sentenced to life in prison.

In 2019, Krasner filed a motion in the Supreme Court of Pennsylvania to declare capital punishment in Pennsylvania unconstitutional. He claimed the death penalty was illegal in the state because of the ban on cruel and unusual punishment in the Pennsylvania Constitution, citing the high turnover rates of convictions by appeals, the racially biased number of sentences given to black and Hispanic defendants, and the large number of convictions overturned due to ineffective counsel.

Following the fatal shooting of Philadelphia police officer James O'Connor IV, Krasner faced criticism from William McSwain, a federal prosecutor appointed by Donald Trump. McSwain, U.S. Attorney for the Eastern District of Pennsylvania, blamed the shooting on a prosecutorial discretion decision by Krasner's office to drop drug charges against suspected killer Hassan Elliott. While on probation for a gun possession charge, Elliott was arrested again on January 29, 2019, for cocaine possession and was released on his own recognizance. Nearly a week later on February 6, Elliott took part in the fatal shooting of Tyrone Tyree. Krasner's office dropped drug charges after Elliott failed to appear in court, choosing to approve an arrest warrant for Tyree's murder instead. On March 13, as part of a SWAT unit carrying out an arrest warrant, O'Connor was fatally shot and Elliott was charged. Prosecutor spokeswoman Jane Roh responded to criticism by stating that the office believed murder to be a more serious crime than drug possession and charged Elliott accordingly. On the night of O'Connor's death, Philadelphia police officers formed a human chain at Temple University Hospital entrance to prevent Krasner from entering.

As of April 2022, Krasner's Conviction Integrity Unit had exonerated 25 people convicted under previous DAs.

He was featured in the 2021 documentary series Philly D.A. which won a prestigious Peabody Award in June 2022 for "crafting a thrilling series that’s both broad and intimate about a man and a movement, capturing what happens when incrementalists meet their match in Big Idea thinkers who want to be doers."

Pursuing police misconduct 
During his time in office, he has aggressively pursued police misconduct. In June 2018, Krasner called for the compiling of a comprehensive list of police officers who had lied while on duty, used excessive force, racially profiled, or violated civil rights, an unprecedented move in order to spotlight dishonest police officers and check their future courtroom testimony.

In July 2020, Krasner's office charged Philadelphia SWAT officer Richard P. Nicoletti with simple assault, reckless endangerment, official oppression, and possession of an instrument of crime. Video footage taken during the George Floyd protests showed that Nicoletti pepper sprayed three kneeling protesters. He pulled down the mask of one woman before spraying her in the face, sprayed another woman at point blank range, and sprayed a man numerous times in the face while he lay on the ground.

2021 re-election campaign 
In his 2021 re-election campaign, Krasner faced Carlos Vega in the Democratic primary. Vega was fired by Krasner from the Philadelphia DA office when Krasner began implementing reforms within the office. Vega, as a prosecutor, was involved in retrying Anthony Wright on rape and murder charges even after DNA evidence showed another man committed the crime.

In the lead-up to his 2021 re-election campaign, the Philadelphia police union instructed its members to switch party affiliation to the Democratic party so that they could vote for Krasner's opponent in the Democratic primary. The top spender in the campaign was a political action committee formed by retired cops. During the campaign, Krasner's opponents argued that his criminal justice reform policies had contributed to an increase in violent crime, however some experts say there is no evidence to substantiate this claim.

On May 18 the Associated Press called the race for Krasner, leading 65% to 35% with 22% of the votes counted. Krasner's victory was considered to be likely due to his strong support from predominantly African-American wards and continued support from progressive activist groups.

Impeachment
In June 2022, the Pennsylvania House of Representatives voted to form the Select Committee on Restoring Law and Order. The vote was 114 in favor and 86 opposed, and was largely along party lines (with all but one Republican voting in favor of it, joined by four Democrats, three of whom were from Philadelphia). The committee was tasked with investigating the possibility of impeachment for Krasner's "dereliction of duty" in handling Philadelphia's gun violence crisis. In August 2022, Krasner was subpoenaed by the committee but said that his office would not comply with the subpoena which he claimed was “wholly illegitimate”. He subsequently filed a petition with the Commonwealth Court of Pennsylvania to halt the select committee's impeachment probe. In September, the Pennsylvania House voted to find Krasner in contempt for defying the committee's subpoena for documents related to his prosecutorial policies. Following the contempt vote, Krasner partially complied with the subpoena and provided the committee with "a number of documents", however some of the documents provided were already publicly available online, according to The Philadelphia Inquirer. On October 6, Krasner filed an additional petition with the Commonwealth Court to invalidate the subpoena.

On October 26, articles of impeachment were filed against Krasner charging him with "misbehavior in office" and attempting to obstruct the select committee's investigation into him.  The articles of impeachment were approved by the House Judiciary Committee in a party-line vote on November 15. The next day, Krasner was impeached by the State House in a 107-85 vote; one Republican and all Democratic members of the House voted against a total of seven articles of impeachment. He was the first person to be impeached by the Pennsylvania House of Representatives since state Supreme Court Justice Rolf Larsen in 1994.

On December 30, 2022, the Commonwealth Court ruled none of the articles of impeachment against Krasner constituted "misbehavior in office". The ruling however would have done nothing to officially halt impeachment hearings originally scheduled to begin in the State Senate on January 18, 2023. Following the Court's ruling, the State Senate voted to indefinitely postpone the hearings.

Electoral history

See also
Tiffany Cabán
Rachael Rollins

References

Further reading 

 

1961 births
21st-century American lawyers
21st-century American politicians
American civil rights lawyers
American people of Russian-Jewish descent
District Attorneys of Philadelphia
Lawyers from Philadelphia
Lawyers from St. Louis
Living people
Pennsylvania Democrats
Politicians from Philadelphia
Politicians from St. Louis
Public defenders
Stanford Law School alumni
University of Chicago alumni
United States officials impeached by state or territorial governments